Joey Pierre (born 5 October 1963) is a Dominican cricketer. He played in sixteen first-class and twelve List A matches for the Windward Islands from 1987 to 1997.

See also
 List of Windward Islands first-class cricketers

References

External links
 

1963 births
Living people
Dominica cricketers
Windward Islands cricketers